Jean de Tournes may refer to:

 Jean de Tournes (1504–1564), French printer, publisher and bookseller
 Jean de Tournes (1539–1615), French/Swiss printer, publisher and bookseller
 Jean de Tournes (1593–1669), Swiss printer, publisher and bookseller